"Pui de lei" is a Romanian patriotic poem. It was written by Ioan S. Nenițescu, author of many other patriotic poems, with "Pui de lei" being one of his most famous ones. It was published by him in 1891 in his work Pui de lei. Poesii eroice și naționale, in which he compiled several other poems inspired in the Romanian War of Independence in which he participed. Ionel G. Brătianu composed a song for the poem in 1902.

The song, along with other ones that also evoke Romania's past and ancestors, was promoted by the Romanian communist authorities. In fact, in 1980, during the 2050th anniversary of the establishment of a centralized Dacian state, the song was officially sung. At the time, there were people who followed a tendency, known as Dacianism (or Dacomania), in which the Dacians were glorified within Romanian history.

However, the song was broadcast in Radio Bucharest (now known as Radio Romania International) by dissident employees on the morning of 21 December 1989, during the Romanian Revolution against the communist government, as a sign of the national uprising that was happening in Romania. In addition, it has been interpreted by the Romanian Land Forces.

Lyrics
The lyrics of the song and their English translation are the following:

References

External links

 

Romanian patriotic songs
1891 songs
Romanian poems
Romanian-language songs